Glen Magna Farms (4.5 ha / 11 acres) is a historic country estate located at the end of Ingersoll Street, Danvers, Massachusetts. It is currently owned by the Danvers Historical Society and open daily. An admission donation is suggested.  Guided tours of the house and gardens are offered from May to July and includes a box lunch.

The estate began during the War of 1812 when Joseph Peabody, a leading Salem merchant, bought a  property with house. In 1893, Ellen Peabody Endicott, his granddaughter, hired the Boston architecture firm of Little, Browne & Moore to expand the house to its current form. In 1926 she was awarded the Massachusetts Horticultural Society's Hunnewell Gold Medal for the estate's plantings. Her son, William Crowninshield Endicott, Jr., continued to improve the grounds, most notably in 1901 by moving the Derby Summer House (built 1794 to designs by Samuel McIntire) to the property. In 1963 the Danvers Historical Society purchased the central  of the property for restoration and preservation.

Today the grounds are open to the public for viewing and special events. Key features of the grounds include the striking Derby Summer House with its enclosed rose garden designed by Herbert Browne; Cushing pergola with wisteria; flower garden with small fountain and geraniums, peonies, lilies, hostas, and roses; old fashioned central garden; shrubbery garden of rhododendrons, hemlocks, forsythia, azaleas, fringe tree, dogwood, and weeping beech; and a carriage road and miscellaneous statuary.

See also 
 List of historic houses in Massachusetts

External links 
Glen Magna Farms
Danvers Historical Society

Farm museums in Massachusetts
Museums in Danvers, Massachusetts
Buildings and structures in Essex County, Massachusetts
Gardens in Massachusetts
Parks in Essex County, Massachusetts
Peabody family